Jaswant Singh Bishnoi (born 1 August 1958) was a member of 13th and 14th Lok Sabha from Jodhpur. He is senior leader of Bharatiya Janata Party in Rajasthan.

Early life

He was born in the village Guda Vishnoiyan in Jodhpur district and was educated at Jai Narain Vyas University at Jodhpur.

Political life
He is senior leader of Bharatiya Janata Party in Rajasthan.
He lost to Ashok Gehlot in the 1998 by narrow margin in Lok Sabha election but won 1999 and 2004 Lok Sabha elections. In 2009 he lost to Chandresh Kumari in Lok Sabha election. He is a former minister of Government of Rajasthan during Bhairon Singh Shekhawat's government. He defeated Ramsingh Bishnoi in the 1993 MLA election from Luni constituency and held Minister of State, Environment and Forests, Lottery, Small Savings, State Insurance, Public Health and Engineering Department in Government of Rajasthan under Chief Ministership of Bhairon Singh Shekhawat. Since August 2014 he has been Chairman of the Central Wool Development Board. In May 2018 he became chairman of Khadi Gramodhyog board of Rajasthan and after a few days was declared cabinet minister of Rajasthan government by Governor of Rajasthan Shri Kalyan Singh.

References

Bharatiya Janata Party politicians from Rajasthan
Living people
India MPs 2004–2009
1958 births
People from Jodhpur district
India MPs 1999–2004
Lok Sabha members from Rajasthan